The Joseph Twitchell House is a historic house in Sherborn, Massachusetts.  It was built circa 1710, or possibly 1690, with a north wing dating from the early 1800s.  It is one of a small number of houses in Sherborn that have elements that may date to the 17th century.  It is a -story wood-frame saltbox house, 3 wide bays, with a massive central chimney, side-gable roof, and clapboard siding.  Inside it is laid out as a central hall, one room on either side, and lean-to at the rear. The Georgian front door is flanked by Doric pilasters and topped by a multi-pane transom and entablature.

The house was listed on the National Register of Historic Places in 1986.

See also
National Register of Historic Places listings in Sherborn, Massachusetts

References

Houses on the National Register of Historic Places in Middlesex County, Massachusetts
Houses in Sherborn, Massachusetts